Francesco Bocciardo (born 18 March 1994) is an Italian Paralympic swimmer who competes in international level events. He is a triple World and European champion, he has participated at the 2012 Summer Paralympics and the 2016 Summer Paralympics where he was the Paralympic champion in the men's 400m freestyle S6.

Biography
Bocciardo has a disability called spastic distal tetraplegia which affects the movement in his legs, he was encouraged to do swimming as a part of rehabilitative therapy at a young age then he started swimming competitively in 2010 at the Italian national championships.

Swimming career
Bocciardo has won three world titles and three European titles in freestyle swimming and his most successful championships was at the 2019 World Para Swimming Championships where he won two golds, two silvers and one bronze.

See also
 Italy at the 2020 Summer Paralympics

References

External links
 

1994 births
Living people
Sportspeople from Genoa
Paralympic swimmers of Italy
Swimmers at the 2012 Summer Paralympics
Swimmers at the 2016 Summer Paralympics
Swimmers at the 2020 Summer Paralympics
Medalists at the 2016 Summer Paralympics
Medalists at the 2020 Summer Paralympics
Medalists at the World Para Swimming Championships
Medalists at the World Para Swimming European Championships
Paralympic gold medalists for Italy
Italian male freestyle swimmers
S5-classified Paralympic swimmers